Enrico Pasquale Ciccone (born April 10, 1970) is a Canadian politician and former professional ice hockey defenceman who played in the National Hockey League (NHL). He currently represents Marquette as a member of the Quebec Liberal Party.

Hockey career
Ciccone is best known for his role in a 1992 incident while playing for the IHL's Kalamazoo Wings in which he was arrested on a battery charge after San Diego Gulls photographer Essy Ghavameddini was cut and received a deep bruise below his left eye that required stitches. Ciccone assaulted him after entering the penalty box where Ghavameddini was photographing the game from.

Ciccone was drafted in 1990 by the Minnesota North Stars.  After playing just 31 games with the North Stars, he was traded to the Washington Capitals prior to the 1993–94 NHL season.  After just 51 games, he was traded to the Tampa Bay Lightning at the trade deadline.  Ciccone also played for the Chicago Blackhawks, Carolina Hurricanes, and Vancouver Canucks before he returned for a second tour with the Lightning.  During the 1998–99 season the Lightning traded him to the Capitals for his second tour in Washington.  His final NHL games were played with the Montreal Canadiens.

In 374 NHL games, Ciccone scored 10 goals and 18 assists, and amassed 1,469 penalty minutes.

Ciccone became caught in a minor incident during the 1996 Stanley Cup Playoffs, when during a game 2 loss to the Colorado Avalanche in the second round, Ciccone was given a 10-minute misconduct penalty, and had to go to the Blackhawks' locker room. Ciccone was seen shoving a referee as he was leaving the ice, and as he was walking to the locker room, was apparently struck by a cup of popcorn thrown by a Colorado fan, which caused Ciccone to briefly attack the fan, before he was hustled away by a security guard. As he was escorted away, Ciccone tried to pull himself away from the security guard and inadvertently struck the guard in the face. The security guard was also an off-duty detective with the Denver police department, and Ciccone avoided charges and a possible arrest by making a public apology the next day.

Political career 
On August 16, 2018, Ciccone announced that he was going to be running as a candidate for the Quebec Liberal Party in the riding of Marquette for the 2018 Quebec general election. He won this election on October 1, 2018.

Personal life
Ciccone formerly worked as a hockey player agent, and was also part of the French broadcast team for the Ottawa Senators. Ciccone is also honored in the Puck in Drublic hockey league, with one of the divisions being named after him.

Career statistics

Regular season and playoffs

References

External links

1970 births
Living people
Anglophone Quebec people
Canadian ice hockey defencemen
Canadian people of Italian descent
Canadian sports agents
Canadian sportsperson-politicians
Carolina Hurricanes players
Chicago Blackhawks players
Essen Mosquitoes players
Hamilton Canucks players
Ice hockey people from Montreal
Minnesota North Stars draft picks
Minnesota North Stars players
Montreal Canadiens players
Politicians from Montreal
Quebec Citadelles players
Shawinigan Cataractes players
Tampa Bay Lightning players
Trois-Rivières Draveurs players
Vancouver Canucks players
Washington Capitals players
Quebec Liberal Party MNAs
Canadian expatriate ice hockey players in Germany